Captain Tobias Furneaux (21 August 173518 September 1781) was a British navigator and Royal Navy officer, who accompanied James Cook on his second voyage of exploration. He was one of the first men to circumnavigate the world in both directions, and later commanded a British vessel during the American War of Independence.

Early life 
Furneaux was born at Swilly House near Stoke Damerel, Plymouth Dock, son of William Furneaux (1696–1748) of Swilly, and Susanna Wilcocks (1698–1775). He entered the Royal Navy and was employed on the French and African coasts and in the West Indies during the latter part of the Seven Years' War (1760–1763). He served as second lieutenant of  under Captain Samuel Wallis on the latter's voyage round the globe (August 1766May 1768) and due to Wallis being ill and confined to his cabin, Furneaux was the first European to set foot on Tahiti, hoisting a pennant, turning a turf, and taking possession of the land in the name of His Majesty (25 June 1767).

Service with Cook 
In November 1771, Furneaux was given command of HMS , which accompanied James Cook (in ) on his second voyage. On this expedition Furneaux was twice separated from his leader (8 February 1773 to 19 May 1773; and 22 October 1773 to 14 July 1774, the date of his return to England). On the former occasion he explored a great part of the south and east coasts of Van Diemen's Land (now Tasmania), and made the earliest British chart of the island. Unfortunately he mapped several place names incorrectly. He glimpsed the opening to D'Entrecasteaux Channel and thought that was Storm Bay. He thought he had rounded Cape Pillar and was on the east coast just south of Cape Frederick Hendrik, whereas he had turned left one stop early and was at Bruny Island, where he named Adventure Bay for his ship. The cape to his north he assumed to be Cape Frederick Hendrik, with Frederick Hendrik Bay on the other side of it, so he put both names on his chart.  Off to the north-east, Furneaux could see where Maria Island should be, but there seemed to be a few extra sights of land, so he changed the name to Maria Isles.

Most of his names here survive; Cook, visiting the shore-line on his third voyage, confirmed Furneaux's account and delineation of it, with certain minor criticisms and emendations, and named after him the Furneaux Group at the eastern entrance to Bass Strait, and the group now known as the Low Archipelago.

After Adventure was finally separated from Resolution off New Zealand in October 1773, Furneaux returned home alone, bringing with him Omai of Ulaietea (Raiatea).  This first South Sea Islander to travel to Great Britain returned to Tahiti with Cook on 12 August 1777. Also of note is that Furneaux successfully introduced domestic animals and potatoes into the South Sea Islands.

Later commands 
Furneaux was made a navigator in 1775.  During the American War of Independence, he commanded HMS Syren in the British attack of 28 June 1776 upon Charleston, South Carolina. Syren, with Furneaux in command, was wrecked near Point Judith, Rhode Island on 6 November 1777.  The Rhode Island Marine Archaeology Project (RIMAP) has published a detailed history of the Syrens activities in the American War of Independence, as well as some of the original documents related to her loss, confirming 6 November as the correct date.  By 10 November Furneaux and his crew were prisoners in Providence, Rhode Island, awaiting later exchange.  RIMAP has also noted that the Syren is one of at least five ships associated with Captain Cook and his circumnavigating men with an historical connection to the State of Rhode Island.

 Taxon named in his honor 
The Furneaux scorpionfish, Scorpaenopsis furneauxi''''' is a species of venomous marine ray-finned fish belonging to the family Scorpaenidae, the scorpionfishes that was named after him.

Furneaux died unmarried in 1781 and was buried in Stoke Damerel Church where he had been christened.

See also
 European and American voyages of scientific exploration

Notes

Footnotes

Citations

References

External links

 
 

1735 births
1781 deaths
Military personnel from Plymouth, Devon
English explorers
Circumnavigators of the globe
Explorers of Australia
English explorers of the Pacific
Royal Navy officers
James Cook
British navigators
Furneaux Group
Royal Navy personnel of the American Revolutionary War